Daniel Kwan (born February 10, 1988) and Daniel Scheinert (born June 7, 1987), known collectively as the Daniels, are a duo of American film directors, producers and screenwriters. They began their career as directors of music videos, including the short film music video for "Houdini" (2012) by Foster the People, as well as the popular DJ Snake and Lil Jon music video for the single "Turn Down for What" (2013), both of which earned them nominations at the Grammy Awards.

They have since ventured into film, having written and directed the films Swiss Army Man (2016) and Everything Everywhere All at Once (2022). The latter became the independent production company A24's highest-grossing film of all time, and garnered the duo three Academy Awards in 2023 for Best Picture, Best Director, and Best Original Screenplay.

Careers

Music videos 
Kwan and Scheinert met while they were both studying film at Emerson College in Boston. Kwan graduated in 2010 and Scheinert graduated in 2009. They went to college with Sunita Mani, who starred with Kwan in the music video for "Turn Down for What", which they directed.

Since 2011, the duo have directed music videos for artists including Foster the People, The Shins and Tenacious D. In 2018, Kwan co-founded the group We Direct Music Videos (W.D.M.V.), described as "a global community of music video directors who are committed to sustainable directorial labor practices".

Transition to film and television 
In 2016, the duo expanded to feature films, writing and directing Swiss Army Man, starring Paul Dano and Daniel Radcliffe, which received positive reviews, as well as the duo winning the Directing Award at the 2016 Sundance Film Festival. In 2019, Scheinert directed the black comedy-drama film The Death of Dick Long, which premiered at the 2019 Sundance Film Festival and received positive reviews.

The Daniels have since accumulated several television directing credits, including Awkwafina Is Nora from Queens, Legion (Kwan only) and On Becoming a God in Central Florida (Scheinert only). The Daniels were attached as directors on a prospective TV adaption of Cat's Cradle by Kurt Vonnegut, being developed by Noah Hawley, but the project was not picked up.

Everything Everywhere All at Once 
The duo announced in 2017 they would write, direct, and produce a science-fiction film with their producing partner Jonathan Wang and the Russo brothers. Everything Everywhere All at Once, starring Michelle Yeoh, Stephanie Hsu, Ke Huy Quan, James Hong and Jamie Lee Curtis, was released in March 2022 to widespread critical acclaim and box office success, garnering several awards and accolades for the duo including Best Picture, Best Original Screenplay, and Best Director at the 95th Academy Awards. The film received 11 Academy Award nominations, more than any other film that year, and won seven. Prior to the Oscars ceremony, IGN calculated that Everything Everywhere All at Once had surpassed The Lord of the Rings: The Return of the King (2003) as the most awarded film of all time.

Upcoming projects 
, the Daniels have signed a first look TV deal with A24. The same year, they also signed a five-year film deal with Universal Pictures.

The Daniels were on the Time 100 Next list in 2022.

In March 2023, it was revealed that The Daniel had directed at least one episode of Star Wars: Skeleton Crew (2023).

Personal lives 
Kwan was born in Westborough, Massachusetts to a Taiwanese mother and a father from Hong Kong. He is married to fellow filmmaker and animator Kirsten Lepore since 2016, and together they have one son. Kwan was diagnosed with attention deficit hyperactivity disorder after researching the condition for Everything Everywhere All at Once.

Scheinert was born and raised in Birmingham, Alabama, the son of Becky and Ken Scheinert. He attended Oak Mountain Elementary and Middle School, and was a student at the advanced magnet program Jefferson County International Baccalaureate School at the campus of Shades Valley High School. In 2023, he stated that in his youth he dressed in drag.

Filmography

Short films

Scheinert only

Feature films

Scheinert only

Television

Kwan only

Scheinert only

Music videos

Accolades 

Directed Academy Award performances

References

External links

Living people
1987 births
1988 births
American film directors
American film producers
American male screenwriters
Best Directing Academy Award winners
Best Original Screenplay Academy Award winners
Emerson College alumni
Filmmaking duos
Filmmakers from Alabama
Filmmakers from Massachusetts
People from Birmingham, Alabama
People from Boston
People from Westborough, Massachusetts
Producers who won the Best Picture Academy Award
Pseudonymous artists
Screenwriting duos